Svetlana Valeryevna Trunova (born June 7, 1983), now Vasilyeva, is a Russian skeleton racer who has competed since 2004. She finished 11th in the women's skeleton event at the 2006 Winter Olympics in Turin.

Trunova also competed at the 2010 Winter Olympics where she finished 16th.

References
 2006 women's skeleton results
 
 Skeletonsport.com profile

1983 births
Living people
Olympic skeleton racers of Russia
Russian female skeleton racers
Skeleton racers at the 2006 Winter Olympics
Skeleton racers at the 2010 Winter Olympics
20th-century Russian women
21st-century Russian women